E. Ballard Baker (October 25, 1917March 1985) was a Virginia jurist who served briefly as the first Chief Judge of the newly created Court of Appeals of Virginia before his death in 1985.  He was succeeded as Chief Judge by Lawrence L. Koontz, Jr. and the vacancy on the Court created by his death was filled by Judge Marvin Frederick Cole.

References

External links 
 University of Richmond School of Law

1985 deaths
Virginia lawyers
Judges of the Court of Appeals of Virginia
1917 births
20th-century American lawyers
20th-century American judges